Issy-les-Moulineaux is a commune in the southwestern suburban area of Paris, France, lying on the left bank of the river Seine. Its citizens are called Isséens in French. On 1 January 2010, Issy-les-Moulineaux became part of the  Grand Paris Seine Ouest agglomeration community, which merged into the Métropole du Grand Paris in January 2016.

Issy-les-Moulineaux has successfully moved its economy from an old manufacturing base to high value-added service sectors and is at the heart of the Val de Seine business district, the largest cluster of telecommunication and media businesses in France, hosting the headquarters of most major French TV networks.

Name
Originally, Issy-les-Moulineaux was simply called Issy. The name Issy comes from Medieval Latin Issiacum or Isciacum, perhaps meaning "estate of Isicius (or Iccius)", a Gallo-Roman landowner, although some think the name comes from a Celtic radical meaning "under the wood". Local legend recounted on the city's official website mentions alternative origin of the name arising from a temple of the Egyptian goddess Isis said to be under the site of the Church of Saint Stephen.

In 1893 Issy officially became Issy-les-Moulineaux. Les Moulineaux was the name of a hamlet on the territory of the commune, apparently named Les Moulineaux due to the windmills that stood there.

History

In July 1815 the Battle of Issy was fought in and around the village, between Prussian and French forces.  This was one of the last actions of the 'Hundred Days' campaign and was the final attempt to defend Paris against the armies of the Seventh Coalition.

The town was once the location of the Château d'Issy, destroyed in 1871, former home of the Princes of Conti. On 1 January 1860, the city of Paris was enlarged by annexing neighboring communes. On that occasion, about a third of the commune of Issy-les-Moulineaux was annexed to Paris, and forms now the neighborhood of Javel, in the 15th arrondissement of Paris.

Issy-les-Moulineaux is home to a community of 5,000 Armenians that have established themselves in the area since the 1930s. The community has two Armenian churches, an athletic club, a school, a monument dedicated to the Armenian genocide, and a street named after Armenia called Rue d'Armenie, and Rue d'Erevan named after Armenia's capital Yerevan. Issy-les-Moulineaux became twin cities with Echmiadzin, Armenia in December 1989.

Airfield

In the late 19th century, an expansive field in Issy had been dedicated to military exercises. This land, owned by the French Army, was made into an airfield in the 1900s during the pioneering era of aviation. Issy-les-Moulineaux soon became a hot spot for aviation in France, the most active airfield in Paris, and the site of many flight experiments. Photographers, newspaper reporters and intelligence agents from other countries gathered there to report on developments.

The airfield of Issy-les-Moulineaux was the starting point of the 1911 Paris to Madrid air race. One of the competing planes crashed into the audience during take-off, killing the French Minister of War Henri Maurice Berteaux. It hosted the trap shooting events for the 1924 Summer Olympics.

The firm of Appareils d'Aviation Les Frères Voisin, the world's first commercial airplane factory (1908) which was initially located in Boulogne-Billancourt, transformed itself into a luxury automobile manufacturing company named Avions Voisin in 1920. Most of Voisin's manufacturing facilities were then relocated in neighboring Issy-les-Moulineaux. Avions Voisin closed its doors in 1940.

The last fixed wing flight occurred in 1953, after which the aerodrome handled only helicopters; it continues to do this, with the ICAO code LFPI. It is operated by Aéroports de Paris.

Demographics

Immigration

Politics and administration
Since the French canton reorganisation which came into effect in March 2015, Issy forms one canton: Canton of Issy-les-Moulineaux.

List of mayors

Economy
Eurosport, the Canal+ Group, Coca-Cola France, France 24, Microsoft France and Europe, Sodexo, Icade, Technicolor SA and Withings are based in Issy-les-Moulineaux.

Transport
Issy-les-Moulineaux is served by two stations on Paris Métro Line 12: Corentin Celton and Mairie d'Issy, two stations on Paris RER line C: Issy–Val de Seine and Issy and three stations on Île-de-France tramway Line 2: Les Moulineaux, Jacques-Henri Lartigue and Issy–Val de Seine. Multiple RATP bus lines have stops or their arrival/departure station in the city.

Multiple Vélib' and Autolib' stations allow subscribers of those services to share bicycles or electric cars.

There was also a cable car project, abandoned in February 2008.

Education
The commune has 17 public preschools, 16 public elementary schools. four public junior high schools, one public senior high school, and three private schools.

Junior high schools:
 Collège de la Paix
 Collège Henri Matisse
 Collège Georges Mandel
 Collège Victor Hugo

Lycée Eugène-Ionesco is the community's public senior high school.

Private schools:
 Groupe scolaire La Salle Saint Nicolas (junior and senior high school)
 École Arménienne « TARKMANTCHATZ » (preschool and elementary school) - An Armenian school
 École Sainte-Clotilde (preschool and elementary school)

Notable people
 Mickaël Brisset, footballer
 Peter Leo Gerety, (19 July 1912 – 20 September 2016), Roman Catholic Archbishop
 Christelle Diallo, basketball player
 Rahavi Kifouéti, footballer
 Jean Jansem, painter
 Leïla Bekhti, actress
 Ali, rapper
 Robert Charpentier, cyclist
 Manu Larcenet, comics writer
 Gilles Vincent, (born 1958), writer
 Sandrine Piau, soprano

Twin towns – sister cities

Issy-les-Moulineaux is twinned with:

 Weiden in der Oberpfalz, Germany (1962) 
 Frameries, Belgium (1979)
 Macerata, Italy (1982)
 Hounslow, England, United Kingdom (1982)
 Dapaong, Togo (1989)
 Vagharshapat, Armenia (1989)
 Pozuelo de Alarcón, Spain (1990)
 Nahariya, Israel (1994)
 Dongcheng (Beijing), China (1997)
 Leshan, China (2003)
 Guro (Seoul), South Korea (2005)
 Ichikawa, Japan (2012)

Since 2018, Issy-les-Moulineaux also has friendly relations with New Julfa (Isfahan), Iran.

Sites of interest
 Île Saint-Germain, an island located in the Seine. The island is divided into two parts, the urban side includes the offices and a residential area. The other side includes a park with the Tour aux Figures (Tower of Figures)  by Jean Dubuffet. The Île Seguin is downstream.
 Musée Français de la Carte à Jouer, a museum of playing cards

Gallery

See also

 Communes of the Hauts-de-Seine department
 List of works by Auguste Carli

External Sources

 World War I Belgian Refugees: Comite Franco-American pour la Protection des Enfants de la Frontiere -- Izzy-le-Moulineux

References

External links

 Issy City Hall
 Issy Tourism Office
 Issy TV

Venues of the 1924 Summer Olympics
Olympic shooting venues
Communes of Hauts-de-Seine
Armenian diaspora communities
Articles containing video clips
Hauts-de-Seine communes articles needing translation from French Wikipedia